Niederrhein may refer to:

Lower Rhine, the northernmost German section of the river Rhine
Lower Rhine region, a region around the Lower Rhine section of the river Rhine in North Rhine-Westphalia, Germany
Niederrhein Airport or Weeze Airport, airport near Weeze in the Lower Rhine region of Germany
"Niederrhein", a 1990 song by Austrian musician Herwig Mitteregger